Max Sandro Barbosa de Oliveira (born 3 August 1972), known simply as Max Sandro, is a Brazilian football coach and former player. He is the head coach of Patrocinense.

Club statistics

References

External links

1972 births
Living people
Brazilian footballers
J1 League players
Hokkaido Consadole Sapporo players
Americano Futebol Clube players
Paysandu Sport Club players
Rio Branco Esporte Clube players
União São João Esporte Clube players
Ceará Sporting Club players
Associação Portuguesa de Desportos players
Botafogo de Futebol e Regatas players
Coritiba Foot Ball Club players
Esporte Clube Juventude players
Avaí FC players
Clube Náutico Capibaribe players
Esporte Clube Santo André players
Clube Atlético Juventus players
Brazilian expatriate footballers
Expatriate footballers in Japan
Association football defenders
Brazilian football managers
Palmas Futebol e Regatas managers
Grêmio Osasco Audax Esporte Clube managers
Associação Desportiva São Caetano managers
Footballers from Rio de Janeiro (city)